"Titibo-Tibo" is a song recorded by Filipino singer Moira Dela Torre for her debut studio album Malaya. It was composed by Libertine Amistoso and it is only interpreted by Moira. The song won at the competition Himig Handog 2017 at the end of November held on ASAP. It was released for digital download and streaming on February 18, 2018, through Star Music. This song also topped that charts for 2 weeks on the Philippine Hot 100.

The song was all about a boyish girl who changed her personality and acts girly after meeting and fall in love with a guy. Amistoso said that the song was based on her true life experiences.

Live performances 
Dela Torre performed "Titibo-Tibo" for the first time at Himig Handog pre-finals on October 15, 2017, and October 16, 2017, followed by the grand finals on November 26, 2020, on ASAP. It was the most viewed performances on Himig Handog 2017.

On December 10, 2017, Dela Torre performed "Titibo-Tibo" on Asap Chillout.

During her grand album launch on Eastwood Mall Open Park, she also performed "Titibo-Tibo" on March 11, 2018.

On December 19, 2018, she performed the song on Myx Philippines.

During One Music X Abu Dhabi along with Filipino artists Inigo Pascual, Maris Racal, Aegis, KZ Tandingan, Maja Salvador, Moira performed "Titibo-Tibo" with her guitarist husband Jason Marvin Hernandez.

At her successful "Braver" concert, she performed the song, as well as her other hit songs "Sundo", "Saglit", and "Torete".

On February 1, 2018, she performed "Titibo-Tibo" on a radio station Wish 107.5.

Music video 
The music video shows how boyish changed her life and personality after she met a guy that made her heart beat. Moira walks as it continues a story of a boyish from her elementary to college days. The music video was released on November 4, 2017, on ABS-CBN Star Music's official YouTube Channel.  As of December 20, 2020, the video has garnered over 4 million views.

Notable covers 

 On March 7, 2020, Jessie Gonzales performed and sang "Titibo-Tibo" on a reality television singing competition, The Voice Teens 2.
 On December 2, 2017, Andel had a chance to sing with Moira Dela Torre on a variety show Little Big Shots.

Media usage 

 A version of the song with the original lyrics was used in an Ellips advertisement featuring Moira and Jason.

Awards

Chart History

References 

2017 songs
2018 singles
Star Music singles